Peter Mamouzelos (born 9 January 2001) is a Greece international rugby league footballer who plays as a  for the South Sydney Rabbitohs in the NRL.

Background
Mamouzelos is of Greek heritage. 
He played his junior rugby league for the Maroubra Lions. Mamouzelos was educated at Champagnat Catholic College, Pagewood.

Career

Early career
He has represented Greece in International Rugby League.

2021
Mamouzelos made his debut in round 14 of the 2021 NRL season for South Sydney off the bench against the Newcastle Knights.

2022
Mamouzelos made only two appearances for South Sydney in the 2022 NRL season.  In round 25, he scored a try in South Sydney's 26-16 loss against arch-rivals the Sydney Roosters in the first ever match to be played at the new Sydney Football Stadium.

References

External links
Rabbitohs profile
Greece profile
Greek profile

2001 births
Living people
Australian rugby league players
Greek rugby league players
Greece national rugby league team players
Australian people of Greek descent
South Sydney Rabbitohs players
Rugby league hookers
Rugby league players from Sydney